Chris Britt is an editorial cartoonist and author from Phoenix, Arizona. Britt is a graduate of the University of Illinois Urbana-Champaign's College of Fine Arts with a degree in visual arts. Britt has been a cartoonist since 1991.

His awards include first place for editorial cartooning from the Washington Press Association in 1995, the National Press Foundation's Berryman Award as editorial cartoonist of the year in 1994, and the Sigma Delta Chi Award for editorial cartooning from the Society of Professional Journalists in 2009.

His work runs weekly in the Illinois Times, and he has worked as a cartoonist at the State Journal-Register of Springfield, Illinois, The Seattle Times, The Sacramento Union, The Houston Post, and The News Tribune of Tacoma, Washington. His cartoons have been published in Newsweek, Newsweek Japan, Time magazine, U.S. News & World Report, The New York Times, The Washington Post, and USA Today. They have also been aired on CNN's Inside Politics, MSNBC, Fox News and ABC's Good Morning America.
Britt currently lives and works from Tucson.
Britt currently works as a children's author. He published his first book, The Most Perfect Snowman, in October 2016 via HarperCollins.

Awards
2007: James P. McGuire Award for Excellence in Journalism
2006: 1st place—Illinois Press Association competition

References

External links
Chris Britt Personal Website

Living people
American editorial cartoonists
People from Phoenix, Arizona
Year of birth missing (living people)
University of Illinois at Urbana–Champaign School of Art and Design alumni